Manuel Rosas Arreola (born 14 October 1983) is a former professional footballer who last played as a left back for Liga Primera club Real Estelí. Born in Mexico, he represents the Nicaragua national team.

International career

International goals
Scores and results list Nicaragua's goal tally first.

References

External links
 elnuevodiario.com.ni
 
 laprensa.com.ni

1983 births
Living people
Footballers from Guadalajara, Jalisco
Nicaraguan men's footballers
Nicaragua international footballers
Mexican men's footballers
Mexican emigrants to Nicaragua
Association football midfielders
Naturalized citizens of Nicaragua
2013 Copa Centroamericana players
2014 Copa Centroamericana players
2017 Copa Centroamericana players
2017 CONCACAF Gold Cup players
2019 CONCACAF Gold Cup players